|}

The John Francome Novices' Chase is a Grade 2 National Hunt steeplechase in Great Britain which is open to horses aged four years or older. It is run at Newbury over a distance of about 2 miles and 7½ furlongs (2 miles 7 furlongs and 86 yards, or 4,706 metres), and during its running there are eighteen fences to be jumped. The race is for novice chasers, and it is scheduled to take place each year in late November or early December.

The race was first run in 1990 and was originally held at Worcester, where it was contested over distances of up to 2 miles and 7½ furlongs and run as the Worcester Novices' Chase. It was transferred to Newbury and extended to its present length in 2000.

In 2017 the race was renamed in honour of John Francome, with the press release explaining that the race "was transferred from Worcester racecourse 17 years ago, so the geographical connection with the Pitchcroft is no longer relevant."

Records
Leading jockey (4 wins):
 Harry Cobden - Elegant Escape (2017), Danny Whizzbang (2019), Next Destination (2020),McFabulous (2022)

Leading trainer  (11 wins):
 Paul Nicholls – See More Indians (1993), Ottowa (1997), Shotgun Willy (2000), Valley Henry (2001), Cornish Rebel (2004), 	Michel Le Bon (2009), Aiteen Thirtythree (2010), Just A Par (2013), Danny Whizzbang (2019), Next Destination (2020), McFabulous (2022)

Winners

See also
 Horse racing in Great Britain
 List of British National Hunt races

References

 Racing Post:

 pedigreequery.com – Worcester Novices' Chase – Newbury.

National Hunt races in Great Britain
Newbury Racecourse
National Hunt chases
Recurring sporting events established in 1990
1990 establishments in England